Susan Vinton Chandler (born November 13, 1953) is an American former professional tennis player.

Vinton, raised in Sarasota, Florida, is the daughter of Richard Vinton, a dermatologist and tennis instructor. She began competing on the professional tour in 1972 and twice featured in the US Open singles main draw. During the 1970s she married Gewan Maharaj, a tennis player from Trinidad and Tobago, but she has since remarried.

References

External links
 

1953 births
Living people
American female tennis players
Tennis people from Florida
Sportspeople from Sarasota, Florida